DAMP—deficits in attention, motor control, and perception—is a psychiatric concept conceived by Christopher Gillberg. DAMP is defined by the presence of five properties: Problems of attention, gross and fine motor skills, perceptual deficits, and speech-language impairments. While routinely diagnosed in Scandinavian countries, the diagnosis has been rejected in the rest of the world. Minor cases of DAMP are roughly defined as a combination of Developmental Coordination Disorder (DCD) and a pervading attention deficit.

DAMP is similar to minimal brain dysfunction (MBD), a concept that was formulated in the 1960s. and which has since been recognised as attention deficit hyperactivity disorder. Both concepts are related to certain psychiatric conditions, such as hyperactivity. The concept of MBD was strongly criticized by Sir Michael Rutter [Gillberg, 2003, p. 904] and several other researchers, and this led to its abandonment in the 1980s. At the same time, research showed that something similar was needed. One alternative concept was ADHD (Attention-Deficit Hyperactivity Disorder). Gillberg proposed another alternative: DAMP. Gillberg's concept was formulated in the early 1980s, and the term itself was introduced in a paper that Gillberg published in 1986 (see Gillberg [1986]). (DAMP is essentially MBD without the etiological assumptions.)

The concept of DAMP met with considerable criticism. For example, Sir Michael Rutter stated that the concept of DAMP (unlike ADHD) was "muddled" and "lacks both internal coherence and external discriminative validity ... it has no demonstrated treatment or prognostic implications"; he concluded that the concept should be abandoned. Another example is the criticism of Per-Anders Rydelius, Professor of Child Psychiatry at the Karolinska Institute, who argued that the definition of DAMP was too vague: "the borderline between DAMP and conduct disorders [is] unclear ... the borderline between DAMP and ADHD [is] unclear"; he concluded that "the concept is in need of revision". And in 2000, Eva Kärfve, a sociologist at the University of Lund, published a book which argued that Gillberg's work on DAMP should be rejected.

Perhaps the strongest criticism of DAMP is that Gillberg and his co-workers in Gothenburg are almost the only people doing research on DAMP. Indeed, in a review of DAMP published by Gillberg in 2003, it was noted that there were only "about 50" research papers that had been published on DAMP and that the "vast majority of these have either originated in the author's own clinical and research setting or have been supervised and/or co-authored by him" [Gillberg, 2003, p. 904]. This is in contrast to ADHD, on which "several thousand papers" had been published [Gillberg, 2003, p. 905]. As far as clinical practice goes, DAMP has been primarily accepted only in Gillberg's native Sweden and in Denmark [Gillberg, 2003, p. 904], and even in those countries, acceptance is mixed.

In 2003, Gillberg revised his definition of DAMP. The new definition is as follows:
 ADHD as defined in DSM-IV; 
 Developmental Coordination Disorder (DCD) as defined in DSM-IV; 
 condition not better accounted for by cerebral palsy; and 
 IQ should be higher than about 50 [Gillberg, 2003: box 1]. (In  the WHO system, this would be a hyperkinetic disorder combined with a developmental disorder of motor function.) About half of children with ADHD are believed to also have DCD [Gillberg, 2003; Martin et al., 2006].

Strong criticism of DAMP, however, has continued. In particular, it has been observed that "the validity and utility of DAMP will remain unclear until stronger evidence of the special status of the overlap between its constituent disorders is provided".

In 2005, there was an hour-long television program broadcast on Swedish TV, questioning why Sweden, almost alone in the world, would accept the DAMP construct.  The program featured critical commentary from Sir Michael Rutter. It also considered some of the controversies over Gillberg's Gothenburg study.

The concept of DAMP (deficits in attention, motor control, and perception) has been in clinical use in Scandinavia for about 20 years. DAMP is diagnosed on the basis of concomitant attention deficit/hyperactivity disorder and developmental coordination disorder in children who do not have a severe learning disability or cerebral palsy. In clinically severe form, it affects about 1.5% of the general population of 7-year-old-children; 3-6% are affected by more moderate variants. Boys are overrepresented; girls are currently probably underdiagnosed. There are many comorbid problems/overlapping conditions, including conduct disorder, depression/anxiety, and academic failure. There is a strong link with autism spectrum disorders in severe DAMP. Familial factors and pre- and perinatal risk factors account for much of the variance. Psychosocial risk factors appear to increase the risk of marked psychiatric abnormality in DAMP. The outcome in early adult age was psychosocially poor in one study in almost 60% of unmedicated cases. There are effective interventions available for many of the problems encountered in DAMP.

See also
Gothenburg Study of Children with DAMP

Notes

References
 Andersson, Emelie (2004), Debatten om DAMP: En kontroversstudie (University of Stockholm). [In Swedish]
 Bagge, Peter (5 July 2005), "Forskarstrid: DAMP ifrågasätts från fler än ett håll", Sveriges Television. (Summary of televised show, in Swedish.)
 Gallup, Raymond; Miller, Clifford G.; Elinder, Leif R.; Brante, Thomas; Kärfve, Eva; Josephson, Staffan (July 2005), "Rapid Responses", British Medical Journal.
 
 
 Kärfve, Eva (2000), Hjärnspöken: DAMP och hotet mot folkhälsan, Stockholm: Brutus Östlings Bokförlag. [In Swedish.]
 
 Rasmussen N.H. (17 November 2003), "Deficits in attention, motor control, and perception: a brief review", Archives of Disease in Childhood eLetters.

Attention disorders
Motor control
Perception
1986 neologisms

da:DAMP